It's a Wild Life is a 1918 American short comedy film featuring Harold Lloyd.

Cast
 Harold Lloyd 
 Snub Pollard 
 Bebe Daniels 
 William Blaisdell
 Sammy Brooks
 Lige Conley
 Helen Gilmore
 Lew Harvey
 Bud Jamison
 Fred C. Newmeyer
 James Parrott
 Charles Stevenson

Plot
Harold attempts to court Bebe but he is turned away from Bebe's home by her mother who tells Harold that her daughter will only date a banker or a councilman.  Bebe's father arranges for Snub to date his daughter as he fits the criteria for an acceptable suitor.  Harold follows Bebe, Snub and Bebe's parents to a dance hall where Bebe is pleased to see him.  Harold distracts the others long enough to have an energetic dance with Bebe.  Harold then gets into a extended fight with both Snub and Bebe's father.  Eventually all the dance hall patrons become involved in the fighting.  The police are summoned. The dance hall manager eventually turns out the lights on the brawlers as the fight shows no signs of subsiding.

See also
 Harold Lloyd filmography

External links

1918 films
1918 comedy films
Silent American comedy films
American black-and-white films
Films directed by Gilbert Pratt
1918 short films
American silent short films
American comedy short films
1910s American films